Koumiba Djossouvi (born November 2, 1982) is a French female rugby union player. She represented  at the 2014 Women's Rugby World Cup. She was a member of the squad that won their fourth Six Nations title in 2014.

Djossouvi played at the 2013 Rugby World Cup Sevens.

References

1982 births
Living people
Place of birth missing (living people)
French female rugby union players
Female rugby sevens players
French sportspeople of Beninese descent
France international women's rugby sevens players
Black French sportspeople